St. Andrew's Cemetery is a historic cemetery located at Walden in Orange County, New York.

It was listed on the National Register of Historic Places in 2010.

References

Cemeteries on the National Register of Historic Places in New York (state)
Cemeteries in Orange County, New York
National Register of Historic Places in Orange County, New York